Ali Qambar Al Ansari is a paralympic athlete from United Arab Emirates competing mainly in category T37 sprint events.

Ali competed in the 100m, 200m and 400m in the 2000 and 2004 Summer Paralympics.  Although he did not win any medals in the 2000 games he did win the bronze medal in the T37 400m in 2004.

References

External links
 

Paralympic athletes of the United Arab Emirates
Athletes (track and field) at the 2000 Summer Paralympics
Athletes (track and field) at the 2004 Summer Paralympics
Paralympic bronze medalists for the United Arab Emirates
Emirati male sprinters
Living people
Medalists at the 2004 Summer Paralympics
Year of birth missing (living people)
Paralympic medalists in athletics (track and field)